Berjaya Auto Alliance, formerly known as Nasim Sdn Bhd (NSB), is a Malaysian automotive company. Founded in 1997 as Nasim, they become the sole importer and distributor for the Peugeot brand in Malaysia. On 9 June 2022, Nasim was sold to Berjaya Corporation's automotive division, Bermaz Auto, who would become the official distributor for the Peugeot brand in Malaysia.

Operations
After a year as importer and distributor for Peugeot in Malaysia, Peugeot became  the third highest selling European vehicle manufacturer  in Malaysia. In 2009, the company sales represented 86% of Peugeot's sales in Asean region.  Until to-date, Nasim has sold about 25,000 Peugeot vehicles to Malaysian consumers.

In 2010, the PSA Peugeot Citroën selected Malaysia as its production hub for right-hand drive markets in the ASEAN region. Under this new partnership, Naza Automotive Manufacturing (NAM) launched the Malaysian made Peugeot 207 sedan in November 2010 which has since been exported to Thailand, Indonesia, Brunei, Sri Lanka and selected right-hand drive markets in Africa. The vehicles are marketed   through the company branches and dealers. In 2011, the firm expanded its model line-up to include the Peugeot 308 CC, Peugeot RCZ and Peugeot 508.

In 2017, Peugeot were the official cars for the Kuala Lumpur Southeast Asian Games 2017, its fleet comprising the Peugeot 408, the Peugeot 508 and the Peugeot Traveller range. That same year, Peugeot were also the official cars for the 2017 ASEAN Para Games.

Nasim network in Malaysia
Nasim's on-going network expansion has 34 outlets located in Malaysia. Nasim also provide 24-hours Peugeot Assistance service to their customers. Nasim also has world's first Peugeot Lounge at the Subang Skypark Terminal.
On 15 February 2008, the company launched RM2 Million Peugeot 3S center in Glenmarie, Shah Alam.

References

External links
 Peugeot Malaysia Official Website
 Naza Group of Companies

1997 establishments in Malaysia
Retail companies established in 1997
Companies based in Shah Alam
Auto dealerships
Peugeot
Berjaya Corporation
Privately held companies of Malaysia
2022 mergers and acquisitions